Charles Theophilus Bolton (1 July 1876 – 15 September 1954) was an Australian rules footballer who played a single game with Essendon in the Victorian Football League (VFL).

Military service

Eight years after his brief senior football career, Bolton served in World War I. He enlisted in the Royal Australian Navy on 12 August 1914, giving his occupation as a carpenter and lying about his age. He spent six months in New Guinea before enlisting in the Army with the 7th Light Horse in June 1915. He fought at Gallipoli before being discharged with heart problems in August 1916.

Notes

External links 

1876 births
1954 deaths
Australian rules footballers from Victoria (Australia)
Essendon Football Club players
Euroa Football Club players
Australian military personnel of World War I
Military personnel from Victoria (Australia)